Josué Prieto Currais (born 27 February 1993), commonly known as Josu, is a Spanish footballer who plays as a left back or a left midfielder for CF Peralada.

Club career

Journeyman
Born in Langreo, Asturias, Josu emerged through FC Barcelona's youth system at La Masia, where he played alongside future Spanish international Gerard Deulofeu. He only competed in the lower leagues or amateur football in his own country, his first professional experience being with Seinäjoen Jalkapallokerho in the Finnish Ykkönen.

Josu signed with Polish club Górnik Łęczna in January 2015. Also in that year he joined Kerala Blasters FC in the Indian Super League, scoring his first goal as a professional on 6 October to help to a 3–1 home win against NorthEast United FC.

On 14 December 2016, Josu converted his penalty shootout attempt against Delhi Dynamos FC to help his team reach the final against Atlético de Kolkata (eventually lost). He subsequently returned to Spain, moving to Segunda División B side Extremadura UD.

FC Cincinnati
On 7 May 2017, Josu signed with United Soccer League club FC Cincinnati for one year; he was announced eight days later, with coach Alan Koch describing him as a varied player, writing, "He is an attack-minded left back, but can also play further up the field if needed." On 29 June, in his new team's first match against Chicago Fire Soccer Club during their semi-final run in the U.S. Open Cup, he scored in the 3–1 shootout win.

On 8 August 2017, Josu agreed to an extension that would keep him at Nippert Stadium through the 2018 season. On 16 April 2018, however, the club announced that they had reached a mutual agreement with the player to terminate his contract, indicating that he would be returning to Spain but not disclosing what his plans were or if he would continue playing professionally.

Lahti
On 8 December 2018, after a brief spell back in his homeland with UE Llagostera, Josu returned to Finland and its Veikkausliiga with FC Lahti.

References

External links

 Lahti official profile 
 
 
 
 
 
 

1993 births
Living people
People from Langreo
Spanish footballers
Footballers from Asturias
Association football defenders
Association football midfielders
Segunda División B players
Tercera División players
Tercera Federación players
UE Olot players
Extremadura UD footballers
UE Costa Brava players
CF Peralada players
Veikkausliiga players
Ykkönen players
Seinäjoen Jalkapallokerho players
SJK Akatemia players
FC Lahti players
Ekstraklasa players
Górnik Łęczna players
Indian Super League players
Kerala Blasters FC players
USL Championship players
Wilmington Hammerheads FC players
FC Cincinnati (2016–18) players
Spanish expatriate footballers
Expatriate footballers in Finland
Expatriate footballers in Italy
Expatriate footballers in Poland
Expatriate footballers in India
Expatriate soccer players in the United States
Spanish expatriate sportspeople in Finland
Spanish expatriate sportspeople in Italy
Spanish expatriate sportspeople in Poland
Spanish expatriate sportspeople in India
Spanish expatriate sportspeople in the United States